The AK-205 is a carbine chambered in 5.45×39mm. The AK-205 is a modernized version of the AK-105, which in turn is a shortened carbine version of the AK-74M. The AK-205 was originally known as AK-105M before being renamed ''AK-205'' in 2018. The AK 200 series AK-205, AK-202 and AK-204 are very similar in design, the only differences being the chambering, barrel length and magazine type.

History 
The AK-205's development was stopped around 2011, but resumed around 2016. The AK-205 was then introduced in 2018 (including all other AK-200 series rifles)

The AK-205 belongs to the AK-200 series which also includes the AK-200, AK-201, AK-202, AK-203 and AK-204. The AK-200 series was basically an improved version of the AK-100 series. The AK-200 series is mainly intended for export.

Design 
The AK-205 features picatinny rails on the receiver cover, upper-handguard and lower-handguard with an optional quad-rail system, allowing the mount of modular accessories including advanced optical sights, lasers, flashlights, vertical foregrips, bipods and grenade launchers. The gun's safety lever also has an extended shelf for the trigger finger. The AK-205's receiver cover is hinged on the rear sight block with a retaining lever in the back which is responsible for maintaining and securing zero. The AK-205 also uses a birdcage-type hybrid flashhider with compensator design features. The AK-205 has a foldable and adjustable telescopic buttstock which can be adjusted to 4 positions, the stock also hosts a cleaning rod. All of these design features are also available on all the other AK-200 series rifles.

References 

Assault rifles of Russia
Carbines
Small arms